Eskdale is a small town near the major regional centre of Albury-Wodonga, in Victoria's north. It is situated in the Mitta Valley, near the river's confluence with the Little Snowy Creek, amongst the foothills of Mount Bogong.  At the 2016 census, Eskdale and the surrounding area had a population of 242.

History
The Post Office opened on 1 July 1885.
A Beaufort bomber crashed near Eskdale in 1945 during a training flight.

The town today

The town has a supermarket, cafe, post office, church, primary school, bowling green and a recently built sports complex.
The town in conjunction with neighbouring township Mitta Mitta has an Australian Rules football team Mitta United competing in the Tallangatta & District Football League.

References

External links

Eskdale Towong Shire
Eskdale/Little Snowy Creek Neighbourhood Environment Improvement Plan

Towns in Victoria (Australia)
Shire of Towong